Edžus Treimanis (born 21 April 1988) is a Latvian BMX racer. He has qualified for and competed in both the 2012 Summer Olympics in London and the 2016 Summer Olympics in Rio de Janeiro. Treimanis has won several Latvian Champion titles. He has won the silver medal at 2011 European Championships. Treimanis was born in Valmiera, Latvia.

References

External links
 
 
 
 
 

1988 births
Living people
Latvian male cyclists
BMX riders
Olympic cyclists of Latvia
Cyclists at the 2012 Summer Olympics
Cyclists at the 2016 Summer Olympics
European Games competitors for Latvia
Cyclists at the 2015 European Games
People from Valmiera